Rudin is a 1977 Soviet romance film directed by Konstantin Voinov.

Plot 
The rich landowner Daria Mikhailovna Lasunskaya organizes a salon in which people are waiting a well-read baron and philosopher, but instead comes Dmitry Rudin, who delivers an article at the request of the baron. People warmly receive Rudin. Daria likes him too. He spends two months in the house, but the problem is that despite his intelligence, he is a very cold person.

Cast 
 Oleg Yefremov		
 Armen Dzhigarkhanyan	
 Svetlana Pereladova
 Lidiya Smirnova
 Rolan Bykov
 Oleg Vidov		
 Zhanna Bolotova
 Vladimir Sokolov
 Vladimir Korenev		
 Lyudmila Shagalova

References

External links 
 

1977 films
1970s Russian-language films
Soviet romance films
1970s romance films